Roberto Citran (born 26 January 1955) is an Italian actor.

Life and career 
Born in Padua, Citran graduated in psychology and founded the university film club "CINEMAUNO" in his hometown. After some sporadic stage works he founded a small theater company, "Punto e Virgola".

Citran is probably best known for his films with the director Carlo Mazzacurati, Paduan like him, who made him debuting in a main role in 1989, in Il prete bello.  
  
In 1994 Citran won a Volpi Cup for best supporting actor for his performance in Mazzacurati's Il toro.

Selected filmography 

 Italian Night (1987) - Gábor
 Little Misunderstandings (1989) - Giuliano
 Corsa di primavera (1989) - Il padre di Isacco
 Il prete bello (1989) - Don Gastone
 Io, Peter Pan (1989) - Fabio
 The Amusements of Private Life (1990) - Belzé
 Condominio (1991) - Roberto Sgorlon
 Ask for the Moon (1991) - Francesco
 Quattro figli unici (1992) - Giorgio
 Ambrogio (1992) - Leo
 Anime fiammeggianti (1994) - il marito tradito
 Il toro (1994) - Loris
 Agosto (1994)
 Policemen (1995) - Guido
 Bits and Pieces (1996) - Middle-aged man
 Italiani (1996) - Leonardo
 Marching in Darkness (1996) - Capitano Marsili
 Vesna Goes Fast (1996) - Il cameriere
 Cervellini fritti impanati (1996) - Valerio
 The Truce (1997)  - Unverdorben
 Le acrobate (1997) - Ex marito di Elena
 La terza luna (1997) - Luca Fabiani
 La classe non è acqua (1997) - Prof. Guido Marinelli
 Nora (2000) - Roberto Prezioso
 Tobia al caffè (2002) - Giuseppe
 Captain Corelli's Mandolin (2001) - General Gandin
 Paz! (2002) - Professore
 Due amici (2002) - Negoziante di elettrodomestici
 El Alamein: The Line of Fire (2002) - The Colonel
 A cavallo della tigre (2002)
 The Good Pope: Pope John XXIII  (2003, TV Movie) - Monsignor Loris Capovilla
 The Tulse Luper Suitcases, Part 1: The Moab Story (2003)
 The Fugitive (2003) - Massimo's Father
 The Tulse Luper Suitcases, Part 3: From Sark to the Finish (2004) - Raoul Wallenberg
 An Italian Romance (2004) - Alvaro
 Hotel Rwanda (2004) - Priest
 The Life That I Want (2004) - Giordani
 A Life in Suitcases (2005) - Raoul Wallenberg
 4-4-2 - Il gioco più bello del mondo (2006) - Tricella (segment "Meglio di Maradona")
 Papa Luciani - Il sorriso di Dio (2006)
 I Trust You (2007) - Aleotti
 Flying Lessons (2007) - Stefano - padre di Curry
 7/8 (2007) - Alberto Molaien
 Night Bus (2007) - Diolaiti
 Detesto l'elettronica stop (2008) - Il Comunista solitario
 Generation 1000 Euros (2009) - Tassista
 Le ombre rosse (2009) - Editore Bergonzi
 Nine (2009) - Doctor Rondi
 Scontro di civiltà per un ascensore a Piazza Vittorio (2010) - Professor Marini
 Saint Philip Neri: I Prefer Heaven (2010, TV Movie) - Cardinal Capurso
 Passannante (2011) - Avvocato Tarantini
 Some Say No (2011) - Edmondo Giannotti
 Shun Li and the Poet (2011) - Avvocato
 Il giorno in più (2011) - Ricardi
 Mary of Nazareth (2012, TV Movie) - Joachim
 Zoran, My Nephew the Idiot (2013) - Alfio
 La prima neve (2013) - Commissario
 Wannabe Widowed (2013) - Fenoglio
 The Chair of Happiness (2013) - The Fishmonger
 Patria (2014) - Giorgio
 Fuori Mira (2014) - Farmacista
 Una nobile causa (2016) - Giulio
 Alex & Co: How to Grow Up Despite Your Parents (2016) - Augusto Ferrari
 Noi eravamo (2017) - Dr. Bassani
 L'ordine delle cose (2017) - Grigoletto
 The Last Prosecco (2017) - Sergio Leonardi
 1991 (2018)
 Noite mágica (2018) - Vincenzo lo sceneggiatore
 Il grande passo (2019) - Piovesan
 Letto numero 6 (2019)
 I Hate Summer (2020)
 Diabolik'' (2021)

References

External links 

1955 births
Actors from Padua
Italian male stage actors
Italian male film actors
Italian male television actors
Living people
Volpi Cup for Best Actor winners